Goes novus is a species of beetle in the family Cerambycidae. It was described by Fall in 1928. It is known from United States.

References

Lamiini
Beetles described in 1928